The Kanadikavu Shree Vishnmaya Kuttichathan Swami temple is an ancient and holy Vishnumaya temple located 20 km southwest of Thrissur, Peringottukara, the cultural capital of Kerala, India.

The principal deity of the temple is Shree Vishnumaya and 390 Kuttichathans. Brahmashree Vishnubharatheeya Swami, the Spiritual Guru and the Madathipathi is the chief priest of KanadiKavu. This temple is the ancestral temple of the Thiyyar community. Vishnumaya is one of the deities worshipped by the Thiyyars.

Main deities 

The main deity of the temple is Shree Vishnumaya Kuttichathan. The sub deities here are Bhadrakali, Bhuvanaeswari, Kukshikalpam and 390 Kuttichathans, Nagaraja, Nagayakshi and Brahmarakshas.

History 

As legend tells, sage Koonamuthappan believed that for the well being of humanity, they needed the presence and blessings of a powerful and easy-to-please deity. Thus, he undertook a severe penance to please the deity of his family. The Goddess soon appeared before him. Koonamuthappan requested the Goddess to give him the Mantram that would enable him to please and possess Chathan Swamy, the son of Shree Parameswara. Pleased at her devotee's penance, the Goddess told him the Moola Mantram to make Chathan appear before him and the Dhyana Mantram to worship him every day. He then went to the Himalayas and following the advice of the Nga Sages and entered into a severe penance. Vishnumaya Kuttichathan Swami soon appeared before him, and he returned to Peringottukara with the deity. After reaching Peringottukara, he consecrated and installed Vishnumaya Chathan Swamy at the place where the Kanadi Family now exists.

Roopakkalam 
The ritual of Roopakalam is usually carried out in connection with the annual festival of Thiruvellattu, in the Malayalam month of Makaram, in the Vishnumaya temples of Kerala. The Roopakalam is a form of ritual or offering to lord Vishnumaya, wherein enchanting and colorful figures of the lord and sometimes, of his trusted friend and ally Karimkutty, is drawn on the ground using multicolored herbal and organic powders. After the Roopakalam is drawn, a family member who is a priest performs puja as per the tantric rites and invokes the lord into the Roopakalam. This is followed by a sacred ritual dance by the priest around the kalam, to the accompaniment of wild music. The dancer then erases the kalam using coconut palm leaves. The colored powders are subsequently distributed to the devotees after the ritual.

Main Offerings to the Deity 
The main offerings made by the devotees include Roopakalam, Chuttuvilakku, Niramala, Brahmavellattu Karmam, Veethu, Guruthi, Divasapooja and Pushpanjali.

Festivals 

Kerala, specially Thrissur is a land of festivals, where people from different religions coexist harmoniously and celebrate festivals wholeheartedly throughout the year. As the same, Kanadikavu is called for the festivals it celebrates.

Thiravellattu Mahotsavam 
The day of the oracle of Vishnumaya in the Malayalam month of Makaram, is with Thiravellattu Mahotsavam. In the month of Midhunam three days starting with the star Uthram are meant as the festival in connection with the Consecration Day.

Thottampattu festival 
Thottampattu Festival is to please Bhuvaneswary who is in the form of mother to Lord Vishnu Maya. Bhuvaneswary is the family deity of Kanady family who was chiefly instrumental for the arrival of Vishnumaya to Peringotukara village. On the day of Thottampattu, Devi is brought out from the Sreekovil where idol of Devi is created as Kalam. Then hymns are chanted about the glory of the Devi. Hundreds of devotees find it an apt occasion to visit the temple.

References

External links

 Kanadikavu Shree Vishnumaya Kuttichathan Swamy Temple official website

Hindu temples in Thrissur district